The University of Opole is a public university in the city of Opole. It was founded in 1994 from a merger of two parallel educational institutions. The university has 17,500 students completing 32 academic majors and 53 specializations. The staff numbers 1,380 - among them are 203 professors and habilitated doctors and 327 doctors.

The university confers Licentiate, Master's, doctoral, and post-doctoral degrees.

Faculties
 Faculty of Philology
 Faculty of Social Sciences
 Faculty of Theology
 Faculty of Mathematics, Physics and Computer Science
 Faculty of Natural Sciences and Technology
 Faculty of Economics
 Faculty of Law and Administration
 Faculty of Chemistry
 Faculty of Art
 Faculty of Medicine

Scientific journal 
The University of Opole publishes a peer-reviewed academic journal Economic and Environmental Studies (print: ,), which deals with economics, environment, and sustainable development, with contributions from academics from all over Europe and Australia. Within the field of economics it belongs to the new institutional economics. The journal is published by the University of Opole and was established in 2001. The editors-in-chief are Joachim Ahrens and Joost Platje.

References

External links
 

University of Opole
University of Opole
Universities and colleges in Poland
1994 establishments in Poland
Educational institutions established in 1994